Gerehbid (also Romanized as Gerehbīd; also known as Ḩājj ‘Alī-ye Gerehbīd) is a village in Koregah-e Gharbi Rural District, in the Central District of Khorramabad County, Lorestan Province, Iran. At the 2006 census, its population was 94, in 22 families.

References 

Towns and villages in Khorramabad County